"Not Me, Not I" is a song written by Delta Goodrem, Kara DioGuardi, Gary Barlow, Eliot Kennedy, and Jarrad Rogers, produced by Barlow and Kennedy for Goodrem's first studio album, Innocent Eyes (2003). It was released as the album's fourth single in Australia on 15 September 2003. The song peaked at number one on the Australian Singles Chart, giving Goodrem her fourth number-one single and breaking Kylie Minogue's record of having the most songs released from an album to reach number one.

Background and composition
This single is a love song, which talks about her pain at losing her first love. There has been speculation she is singing about her ex-boyfriend and fellow Neighbours star Blair McDonough.

The song is acoustic rock, with pop rock influences. It is heavily piano-driven with some use of a string ensemble. The song has a prominent emphasis on the instrumental arranging, and is written in the key or E minor. The chords follow in this order: Em–C–D–B7, and then for the chorus: Em–C–Am7–D.

Chart performance
In Australia, "Not Me, Not I" debuted at number two on the ARIA Singles Chart, behind Dido's "White Flag". The week after, it took the number one position, giving Delta Goodrem her fourth consecutive number-one single in Australia. This broke Kylie Minogue's previous record of three consecutive number ones. "Not Me, Not I" remained in the top 10 for 10 weeks. In the United Kingdom, the single debuted and peaked at number 18, while in New Zealand, it peaked at number 11.

Music video
This video was shot during the early stages of Goodrem's cancer at Newtown, Sydney, Australia. The video clip for the song was filmed in August 2003 and was directed by Michael Spiccia, who has worked with other artists including Disco Montego and Killing Heidi. Goodrem posed in a range of outfits during the shoot at a secret location in Redfern Railroads. The clip includes a trademark shot of Goodrem playing the piano, along with other visual effects including the ethereal goddess scene.

Track listings

Credits and personnel
Credits are lifted from the Innocent Eyes album booklet.

Studios
 Produced at True North Studios (Cheshire, England) and Metropolis Audio (Melbourne, Australia)
 Mastered at Sterling Sound (New York City)

Personnel

 Delta Goodrem – writing
 Kara DioGuardi – writing
 Gary Barlow – writing, keyboards, programming, production
 Eliot Kennedy – writing, guitars, production
 Jarrad Rogers – writing
 Ami Richardson – backing vocals
 Spectrasonics "BackBeat" – drum samples
 Chris Cameron – string arrangement
 Michael H. Brauer – mixing
 Robbie Adams – engineering
 Carl Schubert – assistant engineering
 Greg Calbi – mastering

Charts

Weekly charts

Year-end charts

Certifications

Release history

References

2003 singles
2003 songs
Delta Goodrem songs
Epic Records singles
Number-one singles in Australia
Song recordings produced by Eliot Kennedy
Songs written by Delta Goodrem
Songs written by Eliot Kennedy
Songs written by Gary Barlow
Songs written by Kara DioGuardi
Songs written by Jarrad Rogers